Mahlon Day (August 27, 1790 - September 27, 1854) was an American children's book publisher, printer, and bookseller, based in New York City.

Biography
Mahlon Day was born on August 27, 1790, in Morristown, New Jersey.

Day, his wife and two daughters died on September 27, 1854, when the SS Arctic collided with the French steamship SS Vesta off the coast of Canada in thick fog, and only 22 out of 233 passengers survived, none of them women or children.

Descendants
Through his daughter Sarah, he was a grandfather, and namesake, of merchant Mahlon Day Sands.

References

1790 births
1854 deaths
American publishers (people)
American booksellers
American printers
People from Morristown, New Jersey
Deaths due to shipwreck at sea